is a town located in Saihaku District, Tottori Prefecture, Japan. , the town had an estimated population of 15,321 in 5630 households and a population density of 81 persons per km². The town is known for Mount Daisen, the tallest mountain in the Chūgoku Region. The mountain was an early center of Shinto and Buddhist practice, and the town has numerous designated Cultural Properties of Japan.

Geography
Daisen is located in western Tottori Prefecture, in the west of Saihaku District. The north of the town has a broad coast along the Sea of Japan, and its inland area sweeps up to the Chūgoku Region, specifically Mount Daisen. The Amida River flows north towards the Sea of Japan and forms an alluvial delta in Daisen. Much of the town is within the borders of the Daisen-Oki National Park.

Neighboring  municipalities 
Tottori Prefecture
Yonago 
Kōfu 
 Hōki 
Kotoura

Climate
Chizu has a Humid climate (Köppen Cfa) characterized by warm, wet summers and cold winters with heavy snowfall.

Demography
Per Japanese census data, the population of Daisen has been as follows. The population has been slowly declining since the 1950s

History
The area of Daisen was part of ancient Hōki Province. During the Edo period, it was controlled b the Ikeda clan of Tottori Domain. Following the Meiji restoration, the area was organized into villages within Saihaku District, Tottori with the creation of the modern municipalities system in 1896. The town of Daisen was formed from the merger of the towns of Nakayama and Nawa, both from Saihaku District on March 28, 2005.

Government
Daisen has a mayor-council form of government with a directly elected mayor and a unicameral town council of 16 members. Kotoura, collectively with the other municipalities of Saihaku District, contributes two members to the Tottori Prefectural Assembly. In terms of national politics, the town is part of Tottori 2nd district of the lower house of the Diet of Japan.

Economy
The economy of Daisen is based agriculture and seasonal tourism.

Education
Daisen has four public elementary schools and three public junior high schools operated by the town government. The town does not have high school.

Transportation

Railway
 JR West - San'in Line
  -  -  -  -

Highway
  San'in Expressway

Sister city relations
 -  Temecula, California, United States

Local attractions
Mount Daisen
Daisen-ji
Ōgamiyama Shrine
Nawa Shrine
Mukibanda Yayoi remains

Noted people from Daisen
Shigeru Fukudome, admiral and Chief of Staff of the Imperial Japanese Navy during World War II.

References

External links

 
   
 Daisen guide

Towns in Tottori Prefecture
Daisen, Tottori
Populated coastal places in Japan